Rebecca Giddens (née Bennett, born September 19, 1977) is a United States slalom kayaker who competed from the mid-1990s to the mid-2000s.

Competing in two Summer Olympics, she won a silver medal in the K1 event in Athens in 2004. Giddens also won three medals at the ICF Canoe Slalom World Championships with a gold (K1: 2002) a silver (K1 team: 1999) and a bronze (K1: 2003).

Giddens was born in Green Bay, Wisconsin, and resides in Kernville, California, where she owns a brewpub with her husband, Eric. Her husband finished 20th in the men's K1 event at the 1996 Summer Olympics in Atlanta.

World Cup individual podiums

References

 
 
 Yahoo! Athens 2004 profile

1977 births
Living people
American female canoeists
Canoeists at the 2000 Summer Olympics
Canoeists at the 2004 Summer Olympics
Olympic silver medalists for the United States in canoeing
Medalists at the 2004 Summer Olympics
Sportspeople from Green Bay, Wisconsin
21st-century American women